The Spitzhorn is a mountain of the Bernese Alps, located on the border between the Swiss cantons of Bern and Valais. It lies east of Gsteig (Bern) and north of the Sanetsch lake (Valais). It belongs to the massif of the Wildhorn.

References

External links
 Spitzhorn on Hikr

Mountains of the Alps
Mountains of Switzerland
Mountains of Valais
Mountains of the canton of Bern
Bern–Valais border
Two-thousanders of Switzerland